von Weber is a German surname based on the name Weber, with the added nobiliary particle "von". Notable people with this name include:

 Carl Maria von Weber (1786–1826), German composer
 Max Maria von Weber (1822–1881), German engineer
 Ritter von Weber, aristocratic German family
 Eduard Ritter von Weber (1870–1934), German mathematician
 Karl Ritter von Weber (1892-1941), German officer, veteran of World Wars I and II

See also

Anton von Webern (1883–1945), Austrian composer

German-language surnames